Herman Theodore Schneebeli (July 7, 1907 – May 6, 1982) was a Republican member of the U.S. House of Representatives from Pennsylvania.

Herman Schneebeli was born in Lancaster, Pennsylvania, to Barbara (née Schneider) and Alfred Schneebeli, both Swiss immigrants. He graduated from Mercersburg Academy in 1926, Dartmouth College in 1930, and Tuck School of Business in 1931. He worked as a commission distributor for Gulf Oil Corporation and an automobile dealer in Williamsport, Pennsylvania. He served as a captain in the United States Army Ordnance Department during World War II from 1942 to 1946.

He was elected as a Republican to the 86th United States Congress, by special election, to fill the vacancy caused by the death of United States Representative Alvin Bush, and was reelected to the eight succeeding Congresses. He was not a candidate for reelection in 1976.

The Herman T. Schneebeli Earth Science Center at Penn State University and the Herman T. Schneebeli Federal Building are named in his honor.

References

The Political Graveyard
New York Times Obituary

1907 births
1982 deaths
20th-century American politicians
United States Army personnel of World War II
American people of Swiss descent
Businesspeople from Lancaster, Pennsylvania
Military personnel from Pennsylvania
Politicians from Lancaster, Pennsylvania
Politicians from Williamsport, Pennsylvania
Republican Party members of the United States House of Representatives from Pennsylvania
Tuck School of Business alumni
United States Army officers
20th-century American businesspeople